Martin Pensa is a film editor. Pensa and fellow film editor Jean-Marc Vallée (as John Mac McMurphy) were nominated for the Academy Award for Best Film Editing for the 2013 film Dallas Buyers Club.

References

External links

Canadian film editors
Living people
Year of birth missing (living people)